AS/NZS 3760:2010 is a standard that outlines a testing method and frequency for electrical appliances, created jointly by Standards Australia and Standards New Zealand. It was developed by a committee drawn from both countries.

AS/NZS 3760 is referred to as the test and tag standard (the full given name of the standard is: In-service safety inspection and testing of electrical equipment). This is a benchmark for test and tag as well as electrical safety and is referred to in many other New Zealand and Australian electrical standards. In-service safety inspection and testing of electrical equipment AS/NZS 3760:2010 provides a process to reduce the risk of electrical shock to users of electrical equipment. It also incorporates the physical safety of the item to be tested, and if the item is in an unsafe state there are actions and steps outlined to remedy this. The standard covers electrical equipment that connects to the mains supply by a flexible cord and plug.

The standard was created to minimise electrical hazards in the workplace. Appliances are inspected for damage, and various measurements are made to the appliances' earth continuity, insulation, polarity, and physical condition. 
After testing has determined a pass, a tag must be attached to the appliance indicating when it was tested.

Tags must have the following as minimum requirements:
 'Tested to AS/NZS 3760' reference
 Test Date (DD/MM/YY)
 Retest Date (DD/MM/YY)
 Name of Person or Company who carried out the testing
 Appliance ID (asset number)
 Be non-metallic 
 Non-reusable

Retesting intervals of equipment can vary from 3 months to 5 years, depending on the environment where the equipment is located.

This standard is used in Australia and New Zealand. Colloquially, the standard is often referred to as Test and Tag or portable appliance testing (PAT). Testing can be done by anyone deemed competent by training or experience. It does not require a registered electrician. Many businesses are required to maintain records of their compliance with AS/NZS 3760:2010.

It is a requirement under work health and safety legislation that portable devices are free from defect.  Compliance to AS/NZS 3760:2010 is one method of demonstrating work health and safety legislation compliance. For medical devices, the standard required is AS/NZS3551 as medical devices undergo a different set of electrical safety requirements.

The current regulation is AS/NZS 3760:2010. There is an amendment: AS/NZS 3760:2010/Amdt 1:2011.

References

Standards of Australia and New Zealand
Electrical tests